C/Z Records was a Seattle-based punk rock record label that was established in early 1985 by Chris Hanzsek and Tina Casale. It started with the release of Deep Six which collected the earliest recordings of what later came to be known as grunge. The label was acquired by Daniel House, to whom Hanzsek and Casale sold it after Deep Six proved commercially unsuccessful.

History
The label was first founded in early 1985 by Chris Hanzsek and Tina Casale. The label's first release (March 1986) was titled Deep Six (CZ001). This was a compilation LP that featured early grunge bands Soundgarden, Melvins, Green River, Skin Yard, Malfunkshun, and The U-Men. Nationally, the record was something of a disappointment, and after about 18 months, Hanzsek and Casale realized that running a record label was not a career they wanted to pursue.

Daniel House, bass player for Skin Yard, was in the midst of putting together the band's first record, and took over the operation of C/Z records. For several years C/Z was little more than a hobby, but quickly became an outlet for many unnoticed Seattle bands that House felt were making great music. In 1989, House began working as director of sales for a new Seattle independent record label by the name of Sub Pop. Eventually he left as C/Z became successful in its own right. He subsequently released early albums and singles by notable bands like The Presidents of the United States of America, Melvins, Built to Spill, 7 Year Bitch, The Gits, Silkworm and Hammerbox.

In 1993, C/Z entered into a production and distribution deal with Sony-owned RED Distribution. The deal quickly went sour and bled the label dry in less than a year. House was forced to downsize and re-organize, and it would be over a year before any new releases would see the light of day.

In 1996, the BMG-owned Zoo Entertainment partnered with C/Z. Zoo provided a modest operating and recording budget and assisted in the development of new artists. In 1997, Zoo was to be purchased by Volcano Entertainment and all third party ventures were dropped.

Daniel House returned C/Z to part-time status, releasing only occasional records on an infrequent basis.

Releases
In 2002, C/Z released an odds-n-sods collection of unreleased and unavailable Skin Yard material, Start at the Top.

C/Z released several Teriyaki Asthma compilations, one of which contained Nirvana's song "Mexican Seafood". Nirvana also released their version of "Do You Love Me?" on C/Z's Kiss tribute album Hard to Believe: Kiss Covers Compilation.

C/Z Records bands 

 10 Minute Warning
 7 Year Bitch
 Alcohol Funnycar
 Built To Spill
 Caustic Resin
 Coffin Break
 Crypt Kicker Five
 Daddy Hate Box
 Deadspot
 Dirt Fishermen
 Dose
 Engine Kid
 FEEdbACK
 Gerald Collier
 Gnome
 Hammerbox
 Huevos Rancheros
 Hullabaloo
 Icky Joey
 Jonestown
 Love Battery
 Melvins
 Model Rockets
 Monks Of Doom
 Moonshake
 My Eye
 My Name
 Pain Teens
 Pop Sickle
 Porn Orchard
 Presidents Of The USA
 Rhythm Pigs
 Rollins / Hard-Ons
 Sara DeBell
 Silkworm
 Skin Yard
 Skyward
 Slack
 The Gits
 The Lemons
 The Semibeings
 Thirty Ought Six
 Tone Dogs
 Treepeople
 Tube Top
 Vexed
 Voodoo Gearshift
 Wreck
 Yeast

References

External links
 Official site

American record labels
Record labels established in 1985
Alternative rock record labels
Punk record labels
1985 establishments in Washington (state)